XHEJ-FM (93.5), on-air as La Patrona, is a radio station owned by Alica Medios, the media arm of Grupo Empresarial Alica. It serves the Puerto Vallarta, Jalisco market, airing a Grupera format.

History
XHEJ began its operations as XEEJ-AM, situated at 650 kHz, with a concession awarded to Eva Patiro Pérez on May 22, 1967; the station signed on August 9. It was the first radio station to operate in Puerto Vallarta. By the 1980s, the concession was held by Radio Paraíso de Puerto Vallarta, S.A.; it was operated by Grupo ACIR, which then bought the station outright for $1.75 million in 2004.

The station received authorization to move to FM as XHEJ-FM 93.5 in 2011, the same year it was bought by Alica. XHEJ was Alica's first radio station outside of Acaponeta and Tecuala, Nayarit, but it transmits from Bahía de Banderas in that state. XEEJ, however, was given a continuity obligation to serve 28,075 potential listeners who did not receive other radio service. In 2018, the Federal Telecommunications Institute awarded a social concession to Carlos Martínez Macías to build and operate a new station on 650 kHz, XECSBK-AM; it then ordered XEEJ-AM to cease operations in November 2019, by which time it was already silent.

References

External links
Grupo Empresarial Alica

Radio stations in Jalisco
Radio stations in Nayarit
Puerto Vallarta